Feni (misspelt fenno or fenny, Indo-Portuguese; fénnim) is a spiritous liquor indigenous to the state of Goa, India. The two most popular types of feni are cashew feni and coconut feni, depending on the ingredients; however, other varieties and newer blends are also sold by distilleries. The small-batch distillation of feni has a fundamental effect on its final character, which still retains some of the delicate aromatics, congeners, and flavour elements of the juice from which it is produced.

The word feni is derived from the Sanskrit word , in Konkani; फेन or फेण & in Konkani; fenn; which means "froth"; thought to come from the bubbles that form when the liquor is shaken inside a bottle or poured into a glass. It is generally accepted that coconut feni (palm toddy) was produced before it, and feni followed the same process until distillation was introduced by Europeans. Coconut palms are abundant along the western coastline of the Konkan region in south Asia/ India, whereas the cashew tree was an exotic species of crops, imported by the Portuguese in Goa and Bombay, from what was colonial Brazil in south America. There is ambiguity about when and who first produced a fermented beverage of cashew fruits, to make the distilled spirit of feni.

The feni consumed in southern Goa is generally of higher alcohol content (43–45% abv) as compared to the feni produced in northern Goa. Commercially packaged feni is available at 42.8% abv.

Preparation

Cashew feni

In the traditional method of making cashew feni, only tree-ripened cashew apples that have fallen are picked and taken for the crush. The cashew apples are de-seeded and then dropped into the stomping area. This area is called a collmi and is usually a rock cut into a basin shape. The cashew apples are stomped to release the juice. Stomping has now gradually been replaced by the use of a press called a pingre (cage). The pulp is then hand-patted into small mounds traditionally using a particular vine, nudi, which is snaked around it to hold it together while a heavyweight (typically a boulder) is placed on top. The juice produced through this second extraction process is known as Neero/Niro, and is refreshing to drink; however, it is not used in the fermentation process generally for making feni. The first juice extract, obtained by stomping cashew apples, is transferred traditionally in a large earthen pot called a koddem, which is buried halfway in the ground and left while the juice ferments for several days. Delicate earthen koddem have now been replaced by plastic drums for the sake of practicality. The juice is then allowed to sit for three days as it ferments. No artificial yeast or nutrients are added to hasten the process.

Cashew feni is distilled employing the traditional pot, which is still practiced. A traditional still for feni is still known as a bhatti. The use of an earthen pot as the boiling pot has now been replaced with copper pots, both known by the same name, bhann. The distillate is collected in an earthen pot called a launni. The tradition of cold water being continuously poured on the launni to condense the distillate has now been replaced by immersing a coil in cold water.

Cashew feni is a triple-distilled spirit. The first distillate of the fermented neero is known as Urrak, about 15% alcohol (30 proof). Urrak is then mixed with neero in a proportion determined by the distiller, and redistilled to give a spirit called cazulo or cajulo (40–42% abv). Cazulo or cajulo is again distilled with Urrak to give a high-strength spirit called feni (45% abv). Note that cazulo is generally sold as "feni", as the spirit is considered too strong of an alcoholic beverage for consumption. All cashew feni now available is double-distilled.

Coconut feni

Coconut feni, also known as Maddel or Maddachim Fenni, is distilled from fermented toddy from the coconut palm. Traditionally toddy is collected from the coconut palm by a toddy-tapper called a Reindér. Toddy-tapping—the collection of juice from the bud or spadix of palm tree flowers—has been practiced in the Indian Subcontinent and Southeast Asia for centuries. The sap of the coconut palm is collected in an earthen pot called a zamonnô or damonnem, which is fitted over the spadix (ipoi) that grows out of the base of each coconut leaf. In order to produce toddy, the spadix is tightly bound with a rope (gofê/gophe) made from filaments (vaiê) cut with a small knife (piskathi) from the base of the leaf, while remaining attached to the pedicle. The spadix then must be tapped all around very gently with the handle of the kathi (a flat semi-circular sickle) every alternate day until it becomes round and flexible, a sign that the sap is ready. The tip of the spadix is then cut off to let the sap ooze out into the damonnem.

Toddy is collected from the damonnem in the morning and evening, and then carried down the tree in a gourd-shaped container called a dudhinnem before being poured into a clay pot called a kollsô. The spadix is sharpened at noon by slicing a small piece horizontally off the top, called cheu, so as to reactivate the flow of sap. For three days the toddy used to be left to ferment in clay or porcelain pots, called monn or jhallo.

Coconut feni is largely produced and consumed only in South Goa. It is distilled employing the traditional pot. Coconut feni is prepared in a distillery known as a sôreachi bhatti. The use of an earthen pot as the boiling pot has now been replaced with copper cauldrons, both known by the same name, bhann. The mouth of the bhann is sealed with a wooden stopper called a mhorannem. The vapours from the bhann pass through a tube called a nollo, made from a bonnki/bonnqui stem, and are collected in a clay distillation pot called a launni, which is placed in an open clay vessel called a koddem filled with water. The copper coil is immersed in cold water to condense the vapours.

Commercially bottled coconut feni has a strength of 42.8% abv. Coconut feni is a double-distilled spirit; the first distillate is called a mollop, about 15% alcohol (30 proof). Four kollxem (plural of kollsô) of toddy produce two pots of mollop. Four pots of mollop are then mixed with one kollso of toddy, which is added to distill what is then a fiery coconut feni.

Commerce
The feni selling market is largely unorganised. Locals tend to buy feni directly from the thousands of traditional distillers who run seasonal mini-distilleries or stalls in the villages of Goa. A large volume of feni that is distilled is sold directly by distillers to taverns who have business relationships that extend over generations.

Cashew feni is seasonal, distilled only from late February to mid-May. It is highly dependent on the fruiting of the season. The price of cashew feni is also speculated on the fruiting season.

Coconut feni is produced throughout the year as coconut trees are tapped year round. During the monsoon months, the coconut palms produce more toddy than the drier months. Toddy tapping is very labour-intensive and so is not an appealing profession. This has led to the dramatic decline in production of coconut feni.

In the organised sector, there are also hundreds of brands to choose from that cater to the tourist market. Locals have slowly begun to switch to standardised bottled feni in recent years.

Consumption
Feni can be served neat or over ice, and can be mixed in classic cocktails or with juices. It can be served with a slice of lime, and sometimes with sugar or sugar syrup, which are popular additions.

Popular mixers are cola, tonic water& lemonade, with the latter probably the most popular. Feni is also often mixed with Limca, Maaza, Sprite, or 7up.

Feni has also culinary applications, such as in the marinade for pork, along with garlic, ginger, Indian spices, and vinegar, as the base for the iconic Vindaloo curry.

Geographical Indication

Cashew feni was awarded Geographical Indication registration in 2009 as a speciality alcoholic beverage from Goa, described as a colourless, clear liquid that when matured in wooden barrels develops golden brown tint. This designation was achieved through the efforts of the Goa Cashew Feni Distillers & Bottlers Association and the Department of Science, Technology & Environment of the Government of Goa. The application of a G.I. for coconut feni has been neglected.

Heritage drink 
In 2016, the Goan government initiated a process for feni to be recognised as a heritage brew outside of the state. Goa Chief Minister Laxmikant Parsekar described feni as "part of our culture". Plans include nature tourism where tourists can see cashew harvesting and follow the process of the drink's manufacture. Several distillers urged the government to issue rules on distillation process and ensure that they are obeyed. Counterfeit feni and adulteration in quality were some of the issues raised by participants.

See also
 List of Indian drinks
Bombay Sapphire
Palm toddy
Gin and Tonic

References

External links

 Hic, hic! Hiccups for Goa’s feni industry 
 Goa's feni shows sharp decline in production
 Warwick on Feni
 Seeking GI Protection For Feni, An Indian Brew With A Strong Whiff

Goan cuisine
Indian distilled drinks
Geographical indications in Goa
Fruit brandies